Régis Ovion (born 3 March 1949) is a French former road racing cyclist. As an amateur he won the individual world title and the Tour de l'Avenir in 1971 and placed 15th in the road race at the 1972 Summer Olympics. After the Olympics he turned professional and rode the Tour de France in 1973–78 and 1980–81 with the best result of tenth place in 1973.

References

External links
 

1949 births
Living people
French male cyclists
Cyclists at the 1972 Summer Olympics
Olympic cyclists of France
Sportspeople from Essonne
Cyclists from Île-de-France
20th-century French people